"What Rough Beast" is a phrase taken from the 1919 W. B. Yeats poem The Second Coming and has been used as the title for several works of fiction and non-fiction.

Fiction
 "What Rough Beast", a 1958 science fiction story by Damon Knight, reprinted in the collection Off Center
 What Rough Beast, a 1980 science fiction novel by William John Watkins
 "What Rough Beast", a 1989 episode of Beauty and the Beast, written by George R. R. Martin
 "What Rough Beast", a 2010 story by Matthew Baugh in Tales of the Shadowmen, Volume 7: Femmes Fatales

Non-fiction
 What rough beast? A biographical fantasia on the life of Professor J.R. Neave, otherwise known as Ironfoot Jack, a 1939 biography of Iron Foot Jack by Mark Benney (born Henry Ernest Degras)
 What Rough Beast?: Images of God in the Hebrew Bible, a 1990 book about religion by David Penchansky